Lord Prior may refer to:
Jim Prior, Baron Prior (1927–2016), British politician and peer
David Prior, Baron Prior of Brampton (born 1954), British peer, son of Jim Prior, Baron Prior

See also
Grand Prior, sometimes known as Lords Prior